The House of Houdini is a private exhibit and performance venue located at 11, Dísz Square, within the walls of the Buda Castle in Budapest, Hungary.  The building houses the only collection of original Houdini artifacts in Europe.

History
The owners' private collection includes original Houdini memorabilia: e.g., handcuffs, personal correspondence, and "precious artifacts."  A Bible once owned by Houdini is part of the collection.     It also includes original props from the Houdini film  Oxygen (1999), which featured Adrien Brody, an Oscar winner, and the later miniseries.  The facility opened on June 16, 2016.

Budapest was selected as the location of the premises as Houdini was born in the city. 

The owner is David Merlini, an escapologist who served as technical advisor on the Houdini miniseries.  Its artifacts were previewed at Budapest's National Széchényi Library.  Joe M. Turner exchanged commemorative plaques with Merlini at the then proposed site of exhibit on Houdini's birthday.  This followed an earlier exhibition in Milan, Italy.

The venue is also a center for research into Houdini's life, highlighting his Hungarian and Jewish origin.  Notwithstanding his Hungarian birth, Houdini never performed in Hungary.

Six magicians rotate performance in the "Orpheum" the in house small theater.

Admission
As of September 2023, admission is 3,600 forints for adults and 2,400 forints for children under age 11.  English and Hungarian language shows are available. Visitor entrance can only be gained through decoding a secret "arcane" message; if the visitor fails to solve it, they refund the price of admission

Awards
The House of Houdini has been jointly recognized as a world magic heritage institution by the National President of the Society of American Magicians and the International President of the International Brotherhood of Magicians.

Confusing names and claims
This "house" should not be confused with the "House of Houdini" which was a former Houdini home, purchased in 1908, at 278 West 113th Street, Harlem, now called Morningside Heights, New York City that also displays artifacts.

Likewise, in 1919 he rented the cottage at 2435 Laurel Canyon Boulevard in Los Angeles,  while making movies for Lasky Pictures.  His wife occupied it for a time after his death. As of 2011 the site of the cottage was a vacant lot and up for sale.  The main mansion building itself was rebuilt after it was destroyed in the 1959 Laurel Canyon fire, and is now a historic venue called The Mansion.  While Houdini did not likely live at the "mansion," there is some probability that his widow did.

Acquisition rumors
News reports in the preceding months had raised the suspicion that the majority stake of the company and its assets were to be purchased by Centurion, a US based capital fund for $18.6M. The offer was reportedly turned down by the owner David Merlini.

Other Houdini museums
American Museum of Magic
David Copperfield's International Museum and Library of the Conjuring Arts, which is closed to the public
The History Museum at the Castle (Appleton Wisconsin)
Houdini Museum (Scranton, Pennsylvania)
Houdini Museum of New York
University of Texas Library houses Houdini ephemera and a large collection of Houdini letters and manuscripts.

See also
List of magic museums

References

Notes

Citations

External links
 House of Houdini Official website

Biographical museums in Hungary
Organizations established in 2016
Magic museums
Museums in Budapest